The 2021 WTA Romanian Open, known as the Winners Open due to sponsorship reasons, was a professional women's tennis tournament played on outdoor clay courts at the Winners Sports Club. It was the 1st edition of the tournament held in the city of Cluj-Napoca and was a part of the 2021 WTA Tour.

Finals

Singles 

  Andrea Petkovic def.  Mayar Sherif, 6–1, 6–1.

This was Petkovic's seventh WTA Tour singles title, and first since 2015.

Doubles 

  Natela Dzalamidze /  Kaja Juvan def.  Katarzyna Piter /  Mayar Sherif, 6–3, 6–4.

This was the maiden WTA Tour title won by both Dzalamidze and Juvan.

Singles main-draw entrants

Seeds

 Rankings are as of July 26, 2021.

Other entrants
The following players received wildcards into the main draw:
  Alex Eala
  Elena-Gabriela Ruse
  Briana Szabó
  Evelyne Tiron

The following player received entry using a protected ranking:
  Andrea Petkovic

The following players received entry from the qualifying draw:
  Alexandra Dulgheru
  Jana Fett
  Aleksandra Krunić
  Seone Mendez
  Paula Ormaechea
  Panna Udvardy

Withdrawals
Before the tournament
  Tímea Babos → replaced by  Katarzyna Kawa
  Irina-Camelia Begu → replaced by  Viktória Kužmová
  Elisabetta Cocciaretto → replaced by  Mihaela Buzărnescu
  Zarina Diyas → replaced by  Jaqueline Cristian
  Sara Errani → replaced by  Kristína Kučová
  Viktorija Golubic → replaced by  Mayar Sherif
  Polona Hercog → replaced by  Anna Karolína Schmiedlová
  Tereza Martincová → replaced by  Lesia Tsurenko
  Jasmine Paolini → replaced by  Réka Luca Jani
  Arantxa Rus → replaced by  Çağla Büyükakçay
  Patricia Maria Țig → replaced by  Lara Arruabarrena

Doubles main-draw entrants

Seeds

Rankings are as of July 26, 2021.

Other entrants
The following pairs received wildcards into the doubles main draw:
  Ana Bogdan /  Jaqueline Cristian
  Miriam Bulgaru /  Irina Fetecău

The following pair received entry using a protected ranking:
  Alexandra Panova /  Julia Wachaczyk

Withdrawals
Before the tournament
  Irina-Camelia Begu /  Andreea Mitu → replaced by  Lara Arruabarrena /  Andreea Mitu
  Anna Bondár /  Fanny Stollár → replaced by  Katarzyna Piter /  Mayar Sherif
  Anna Danilina /  Ulrikke Eikeri → replaced by  Anna Bondár /  Ulrikke Eikeri
  Viktória Kužmová /  Arantxa Rus → replaced by  Alena Fomina /  Ekaterina Yashina
  Vivian Heisen /  Alicja Rosolska → replaced by  Viktória Kužmová /  Alicja Rosolska
  Ekaterine Gorgodze /  Paula Kania-Choduń → replaced by  Oana Georgeta Simion /  Gabriela Talabă

References

External links 
 Official WTA tournament profile
 Official website

2021 WTA Tour
2021 in Romanian women's sport
August 2021 sports events in Romania
2021 in Romanian tennis
Sport in Cluj-Napoca